The Inside Story is a 1948 American comedy film directed by Allan Dwan and written by Mary Loos and Richard Sale. The film stars Marsha Hunt, William Lundigan, Charles Winninger, Gail Patrick, Gene Lockhart and Florence Bates. The film was released on March 14, 1948 by Republic Pictures.

Plot

Cast   
Marsha Hunt as Francine Taylor
William Lundigan as Waldo 'Bill' Williams
Charles Winninger as Uncle Ed
Gail Patrick as Audrey O'Connor
Gene Lockhart as Horace Taylor
Florence Bates as Geraldine Atherton
Hobart Cavanaugh as Mason 
Allen Jenkins as Eddie
Roscoe Karns as Eustace Peabody
Robert Shayne as T.W. 'Tom' O'Connor
Will Wright as J.J. Johnson
William Haade as Rocky
Frank Ferguson as Eph 
Tom Fadden as Ab Follansbee

References

External links 
 

1948 films
American comedy films
1948 comedy films
Republic Pictures films
Films directed by Allan Dwan
Films scored by Nathan Scott
American black-and-white films
1940s English-language films
1940s American films